James Noble Adam (March 1, 1842 – February 9, 1912) was a businessman and founder of the J. N. Adam & Co. as well as the 45th Mayor of Buffalo, New York, serving 1906–1909.

Early life
James Noble Adam was born in Peebles, Scotland on March 1, 1842, a son of Reverend Thomas Adam, a Presbyterian minister.

Career
He began his business career in Scotland, where he lived until about 1872, when he moved to the United States upon the advice of his brother, Robert B. Adam, co-founder of Adam, Meldrum & Anderson. He initially settled at New Haven, Connecticut, where he began a successful retail operation. In 1881, he moved back to Buffalo and started a full-scale department store at Main and Eagle Streets, the J. N. Adam & Co.  In 1905, he retired from the company.

He served as President of the Idlewood Association, a summer resort colony in Lake View, NY, during the 1880s and 1890s.

In 1901, he was elected alderman of the 24th ward. He was elected mayor on November 7, 1905, as the Democratic candidate, serving from 1906 until 1909.  He did not run for another term.

Personal life
On January 9, 1872, he married Margaret Linton Paterson of Edinburgh, she died in 1894. They did not have children.

He died at Buffalo on February 9, 1912, and was buried in St. Cuthbert's Cemetery in Edinburgh, Scotland, next to his wife.

Philanthropy
Some time between 1910 and 1915, he purchased almost  of land adjacent to the village of Perrysburg, New York using proceeds from his own personal fortune to establish a tuberculosis asylum. A hospital was opened known as the J. N. Adam Memorial Hospital for Tuberculosis; it later became the J. N. Adam State School for Severely Mentally Retarded.

References

1842 births
1912 deaths
Mayors of Buffalo, New York
19th-century American politicians
People from Peebles
British emigrants to the United States
19th-century American businesspeople
Burials in Scotland